Madison Consolidated High School is a school, in Madison, Indiana. It is a part of the Madison Consolidated Schools.

See also
 List of high schools in Indiana

References

External links
 Madison High School profile page from the Indiana Department of Education

Madison, Indiana
Public high schools in Indiana
Schools in Jefferson County, Indiana